The Beginning and End of the Universe is a two-part British television series outlining the theory of the beginning of the universe and the theories about its ending.

Episodes

Episode One: The Beginning
This episode, exploring theories of how the universe came into being, outlines the realisation of Edwin Hubble that the universe is expanding, and the discovery of the residual radiation that gave weight to the Big Bang theory. It also highlights some lesser known theorists including Georges Lemaître, who first theorised that there was a big bang, Ralph Alpher, who stated that the light from this should be detectable, and Cecilia Payne, who calculated that hydrogen and helium were the dominant elements in the universe. The episode concludes at the Large Hadron Collider, where physicists create matter in a similar manner to the Big Bang.

Episode Two: The End
This episode explores the theories of the big crunch, the big rip and the big freeze, that are postulated by physicists as possible fates for the universe. Al-Khalili indicates that the difficulty in understanding this is our limited ability to comprehend something of such immensity both physically and philosophically. So, rather than suggesting an answer, he provides the historical background for how we came to know what we know, such as how elements are forged inside stars and how gravity provides the key to the fate of the universe, and what we don't know, such as the nature of dark matter and dark energy.

Reception 
Jack Seale, writing for The Guardian, commends the Al-Khalili for, "his usual mix of spectacular locations, clear explanations, a few gags and the stories of scientists who made crucial breakthroughs." Gary Rose, writing for RadioTimes however points out that while Al-Khalili is "as watchable as ever", this series, unlike his earlier series Atom, covers well-trodden ground and while there are "oodles of graphs and stats," which he explains, "with seemingly effortless lucidity," regular viewers of Horizon, "might be immune to the barrage of cosmic stats."

References

External links 
 
 The Beginning and End of the Universe at OpenLearn
 

2016 British television series debuts
2016 British television series endings
2010s British documentary television series
BBC high definition shows
BBC television documentaries about history
BBC television documentaries about science
British documentary films
Documentary films about the history of science
Historical television series
History of electrical engineering
English-language television shows
BBC television miniseries
2010s British television miniseries
Documentary films about outer space